South Central may refer to:

Entertainment
 South Central (film), a 1992 film starring Glenn Plummer
 South Central (soundtrack), a soundtrack album from the film
 South Central (TV series), a 1994 comedy-drama starring Larenz Tate

Places
 South Central China, a region of the People's Republic of China
 South Central Province, Maldives
 South Central United States 
 South Central Alaska, a region containing the Anchorage metropolitan area, U.S.
 South Los Angeles, an area in Los Angeles, California, U.S., formerly South Central Los Angeles
 South Central, Wichita, Kansas, U.S.

Rail transport
 South Central Railway zone, a part of Indian Railways
 Connex South Central, a train operating company in England from 1996 until 2001
 Southern (train operating company), a train operating company in England named South Central from 2001 until 2004

Other uses
 South Central Conference (disambiguation)
 South Central Region (WFTDA)

See also

 South (disambiguation)
 Central (disambiguation)
 Centre (disambiguation)
 Center (disambiguation)